Seven Women or 7 Women is a 1966 film drama.

Seven Women may also refer to:

 Seven Women, a 1929 novel by William M. John
 Seven Women (1944 film), an Argentine drama film
 Seven Women (1953 film), a Mexican drama film
 A Casa das Sete Mulheres (TV series)  (English title: Seven Women), a 2003 Brazilian miniseries

See also
 Seven Women from Hell, a 1961 war drama
 Seven Vengeful Women, a 1966 western film
 Seven (play), a documentary play written by seven women playwrights
 Seven Sisters (disambiguation)